Tofiga Fepulea'i  is a New Zealand-based actor and comedian of Samoan descent best known as a member of the stand-up comedy duo Laughing Samoans.

Biography
Fepulea'i was born and grew up in Wellington, New Zealand. His mother is Fuamago Malae Malagamaali'i Fepulea'i from Papa Sataua, Falealupo, Sagone and Fasito'outa and his father is Tu'ua Semurana Fepulea'i from Fusi Safotulafai and Sale'aula, Savai’i.

He was educated at Rongotai College.

Fepulea'i's first stand-up comedy show was called Laughing with Samoans. First performed at the New Zealand Fringe Festival in Wellington in 2003 it changed name and became a duo performed with Eteuati Ete called the Laughing Samoans. Fepulea'i and Ete have toured this show around New Zealand, places in the Pacific, Australia and North America. Title of their shows include Laughing with Samoans (2003), A Small Samoan Wedding (2005), Off Work (2007), and Choka Block (2011) with DVD's produced too. In 2010 they made a television series The Laughing Samoans at Large. The Laughing Samoans disbanded in 2016.

Among the characters Fepulea'i and Ete perform in the Laughing Samoans are two women, Aunty Tala and her niece, Fai. Scholar Sarina Pearson says of these characters, "Whether Fepulea‘i and Ete are enacting a relatively straightforward parody of women or performing yet another layer of gender inversion by parodying fa‘afafine is ambiguous."

In April 2017 Fepulea'i premiered his first solo show called I   It in Auckland, with presentations in Wellington and Samoa.

The first acting role for Fepulea'i in a feature film was in 2020 in the film Take Home Pay.

In 2021 his show Sorry bout it was part of the New Zealand Comedy Festival national tour and features James Nokise as the opening act.

Fepulea'i was a youth worker for 12 years and he has a company 3Sons that hold school holiday programmes for Pasifika boys called o a’u lea (this is me) about wellbeing and identity.

Alongside Inangaro Vakaafi, Fepulea'i has been co-hosting a mid-morning radio show called Island Time on Radio 531pi (Pacific Media).

References

External links
Laughing Samoans Profile
Tofiga's Blog

Living people
New Zealand people of Samoan descent
New Zealand male actors
New Zealand male comedians
Male actors from Wellington City
People educated at Rongotai College
Actors of Samoan descent
1974 births